Li Luoneng (1807–1888) was a Chinese martial artist from Hebei province. He was also known as Li Feiyu, Li Nengran, Li Laonong, and Li Neng Jang, and was nicknamed "Divine Fist Li".  He learned the internal martial art of Xinyiquan (Heart and Intention Boxing) from Dai Wenxiong, son of Dai Long Bang, and later modified the style into Xingyiquan (Form and Intention Boxing).

By 1836, he had already excelled in the martial arts of Tongbei and Gongliquan.  In order to learn Xinyi, he traveled to Shanxi to study with Dai Wenxiong. Initially, Dai Wenxiong refused to teach the newcomer. Li found a plot of land and started a farm so he could stay in town.  He grew vegetables, and every day he would deliver his product to market, but to the Dai family he would deliver produce free of charge.  This display of determination persuaded Dai Wenxiong to take him on as a student. Li Luoneng practiced with Master Dai for ten years, and went on to become one of the best-known Xingyi Masters of his time, as well a popularizer of the art.

Li Luoneng introduced a number of variations to the style he learned from his teacher.  He replaced the splitting fist piguaquan with a palm strike. He also changed the name xinyi (Heart and intention boxing) to xingyi (Form and intention boxing).  Later he had a number of students, the most famous of which was Guo Yunshen.  Guo Yunshen in turn was the teacher of Wang Xiangzhai, who popularized the qigong exercise known as zhan zhuang (post standing).

References

Chinese xingyiquan practitioners
Neijia
People from Hengshui
1888 deaths
Sportspeople from Hebei
1807 births